Lot 29 is a township in Queens County, Prince Edward Island, Canada.  It is part of Hillsboro Parish. Lot 29 was awarded to Admiral Charles Saunders in the 1767 land lottery.

Communities

Incorporated municipalities:

 Crapaud
 Victoria

Civic address communities:

 Argyle Shore
 Crapaud
 DeSable
 Hampton
 Inkerman
 Kellys Cross
 South Melville
 Stanchel
 Westmoreland
 Victoria

References

29
Geography of Queens County, Prince Edward Island